While hard data on corruption is difficult to collect, corruption in Indonesia is clearly seen through public opinion, collated through surveys as well as observation of how each system runs. 

Transparency International's 2022 Corruption Perception Index ranks the country 110th place out of 180 countries, a downturn from 96th place the previous year. The 180 countries in the Index are ranked on a scale where the lowest-ranked countries are perceived to have the most honest public sector.

There are two key areas in the public sector in which corruption in Indonesia can be found. These are the justice and civil service sectors. Corruption within the justice sector is seen by its ineffectiveness to enforce laws, failure to uphold justice, hence undermining the rule of law. The areas of corruption within this sector include the police and the courts. In the 2008 Public Sector Integrity Survey, the Supreme Court ranked the lowest in integrity in comparison to the other public services in Indonesia. The courts were viewed to make decisions unfairly and have high unofficial costs.

Evidence of corruption within the civil service comes from surveys conducted within the sector. Some surveys found out that almost half were found to have received bribes. Civil servants themselves admit to corruption.

In January 2012, it was reported that Indonesia has lost as much as Rp 2.13 trillion (US$238.6 million) to corruption in 2011. A study conducted by Indonesia Corruption Watch, a non-profit organization co-ordinated by Danang Widoyoko, said that embezzlement accounted for most of the money lost and that “government investment was the sector most prone to graft.”

Companies are concerned about red tape and widespread extortion in the process of obtaining licences and permits, and they often faced demand for irregular fees or concessions based on personal relationships when obtaining government contracts. Companies have also reported regular demand for cash payments and expectations for gifts and special treatments by Indonesian officials.

Economic and social costs
Corruption is an important development challenge that poses economic and social costs in Indonesia. Interference in public laws and policies for the sake of personal or private gain has weakened the competitiveness of Indonesia.
 
About one-quarter of ministries suffer from budgetary diversions in Indonesia. Households spent approximately 1% while enterprises spent at least 5% of monthly company revenue on unofficial payments. Social costs due to corruption in Indonesia include the weakening of government institutions and the rule of law. Increases in crime due to smuggling and extortion involve the institutions that are supposed to be protecting citizens. The people who suffer most are the poor as they are pressured to finance payments through their already tight budgets and the effectiveness of social services are less accessible indirectly. These concerns were voiced by the poor urban communities of Indonesia themselves in a joint World Bank-Partnership for Governance Reform research project, entitled “Corruption and the Poor”.

Efforts to curb corruption
Anti-corruption efforts began in Indonesia in the 1950s. There have been some efforts to battle corruption with the creation of the ombudsman and the Assets Auditing Commission (KPKPN). It has been an important agenda and part of Indonesia's official reform program since May 1998. However, the efforts made are questionable as there has been limited success to reduce corruption. Some obstacles that impeded the improvement of corruption included political and economic constraints, and the complex nature of the corruption itself. Following strong criticism of corruption at the beginning of the New Order regime in the late 1960s a Commission of Four was appointed by president Suharto in 1970. The report of the commission noted that corruption was "rampant" but none of the cases it said were in need of urgent action were followed up. Laws were passed in 1999 giving the police and prosecution service the authority to investigate corruption cases.

These efforts have taken the shape of ordering corruption convicts to pay back all the money they have stolen. On 6 March 2012, the Jakarta Corruption Court sentenced Ridwan Sanjaya, an official from the Ministry of Energy and Mineral Resources, to six years in prison for rigging a tender bid for a home solar energy system project in 2009 worth IDR526 billion (US$57.86 million). 

He was found guilty of accepting IDR 14.6 billion in kickbacks, resulting in IDR131 billion in state losses. The Corruption Eradication Commission (KPK) stated that it will use Ridwan's verdict as material to develop the investigation on the graft scandal involving the Solar Home System project.

High-profile corruption scandals involving major banks and financial corporations include the Bank Bali scandal, BLBI case, Century Bank case, and the Jiwasraya scandal.

Corruption charges against Suharto
 
Investigations into allegations of corruption against Indonesian former president/dictator Suharto began immediately after his 32-year rule. In Global Transparency Report, made by Transparency International in 2004, he was ranked as the world's most corrupt leader. The report accused Suharto of causing losses of US$15–35 billion for the Indonesian government.

Suharto headed several organizations during his rule, with various functions, including to provide educational, health, and give support for veterans of Trikora. All of these organizations were suspected of receiving illicit funds, which was embezzled from the state.

See also
 Corruption Eradication Commission
 Corruption charges against Suharto
 International Anti-Corruption Academy
 Group of States Against Corruption
 International Anti-Corruption Day
 ISO 37001 Anti-bribery management systems
 United Nations Convention against Corruption
 OECD Anti-Bribery Convention
 Transparency International
 Corruption in Malaysia

References

External links
Indonesia Corruption Profile from the Business Anti-Corruption Portal

 
Indonesia